Al-Kahina, also known as Dihya, was a Berber queen of the Aurès and a religious and military leader who led indigenous resistance to the Muslim conquest of the Maghreb, the region then known as Numidia notably defeating the Umayyad forces in the Battle of Meskiana after which she became the uncontested ruler of the whole Maghreb, before being decisively defeated at the Battle of Tabarka. She was born in the early 7th century AD and died around the end of the 7th century in modern-day Algeria.

Origins and religion
Her personal name is one of these variations: Daya, Dehiya, Dihya, Dahya or Damya. Her title was cited by Arabic-language sources as al-Kāhina (the priestess soothsayer). This was the nickname given to by her Muslim opponents because of her alleged ability to foresee the future.

She was born into the Jrāwa Zenata tribe in the early 7th century. For five years she ruled a free Berber state from the Aurès Mountains to the oasis of Gadames (695–700 AD). But the Arabs, commanded by Musa bin Nusayr, returned with a strong army and defeated her. She fought at the El Djem Roman amphitheater but finally was killed in combat near a well that still bears her name, Bir al Kahina in Aures.

Accounts from the 19th century on claim she was of Jewish religion or that her tribe were Judaized Berbers. According to al-Mālikī, she was accompanied in her travels by an "idol". Both Mohamed Talbi and Gabriel Camps interpreted this idol as a Christian icon, either of Christ, the Virgin, or a saint protecting the queen. M'hamed Hassine Fantar held that this icon represented a separate Berber deity, suggesting she followed traditional Berber religion. However, Dihya being a Christian remains the most likely hypothesis.

The idea that the Jarawa were Judaized comes from the medieval historian Ibn Khaldun, who named them among seven Berber tribes. Hirschberg and Talbi note that Ibn Khaldun seems to have been referring to a time before the advent of the late Roman and Byzantine empires, and a little later in the same paragraph seems to say that by Roman times "the tribes" had become Christianized. As early as 1963, the Israeli historian H.Z. Hirschberg, in retranslating the text of Ibn Khaldun and rigorously repeating the whole document, questioned this interpretation, and in general the existence of large Jewish Berber tribes in the end of Antiquity. In the words of H.Z. Hirschberg, "of all the known movements of conversion to Judaism and incidents of Judaizing, those connected with the Berbers and Sudanese in Africa are the least authenticated. Whatever has been written on them is extremely questionable."

Over four centuries after her death, Tunisian hagiographer al-Mālikī seems to have been among the first to state she resided in the Aurès Mountains. Seven centuries after her death, the pilgrim at-Tijani was told she belonged to the Lūwāta tribe. When the later historian Ibn Khaldun came to write his account, he placed her with the Jarawa tribe.

According to various Muslim sources, al-Kāhinat was the daughter of Tabat, or some say Mātiya. These sources depend on tribal genealogies, which were generally concocted for political reasons during the 9th century.

Ibn Khaldun records many legends about Dihyā. A number of them refer to her long hair or great size, both legendary characteristics of sorcerers. She is also supposed to have had the gift of prophecy and she had three sons, which is characteristic of witches in legends. Even the fact that two were her own and one was adopted (an Arab officer she had captured) was an alleged trait of sorcerers in tales. Another legend claims that in her youth, she had supposedly freed her people from a tyrant by agreeing to marry him and then murdering him on their wedding night. Virtually nothing else of her personal life is known.

Conflicts and legends 

Dihya succeeded Kusaila as the war leader of the Berber tribes in the 680s and opposed the encroaching Arab Islamic armies of the Umayyad Dynasty. Hasan ibn al-Nu'man marched from Egypt and captured the major Byzantine city of Carthage and other cities (see Muslim conquest of North Africa). Searching for another enemy to defeat, he was told that the most powerful monarch in North Africa was "the Queen of the Berbers" (Arabic: malikat al-barbar) Dihyā, and accordingly marched into Numidia. In 698, the armies met near Meskiana in the present-day province of Oum el-Bouaghi at the Battle of Meskiana (or "battle of camels") in Algeria.

Dihya defeated Hasan so soundly that he fled Ifriqiya and holed up in Cyrenaica (Libya) for four or five years. Realizing that the enemy was too powerful and bound to return, she was said to have embarked on a scorched earth campaign, which had little impact on the mountain and desert tribes, but lost her the crucial support of the sedentary oasis-dwellers. Instead of discouraging the Arab armies, her desperate decision hastened defeat.

The story of the Kahina is told by a variety of cultures, and each story often offers a different, or even contradictory, perspective. For example, the story is used to promote feminist beliefs. Additionally, it is even told by Arabs to promote their own nationalism. For the Arabs, they told the story in a perspective that made the Kahina seem like a sorcerer, all in an attempt to discredit her. The story of the Kahina was told to paint colonialism in a positive light. The story was told with a message saying that it represented the freeing of Berbers from the Arabs.

Another, lesser known account of Dihyā claimed that she had an interest in early studies of desert birds. While this view may or may not be plausible, some evidence has been recovered at the site of her death place, modern-day Algeria. Several fragments of early parchment with a painting of a bird on them were found, although there's no way to conclude the fragments were hers. However, it is possible that she began her interest while in Libya, as the painting was of a Libyan bird species.

Defeat and death 

Hasan eventually returned and, aided by communications with the captured officer Khalid bin Yazid al-Qaysi adopted by Dihya, defeated her at the Battle of Tabarka (a locality in present-day Tunisia near the Algerian borders) about which there is some uncertainty. According to some accounts, Dihya died fighting the invaders, sword in hand. Other accounts say she committed suicide by swallowing poison rather than be taken by the enemy. This final act occurred in the 690s or 700s, with 703 CE given as the most likely year. In that year, she was, according to Ibn Khaldun, 127 years old. This is evidently yet another of the many myths which surround her. In either case she was beheaded, and her head was sent back to the Umayyad Caliph in Damascus as proof of her death.

According to many historians, Bagay and Khenchla converted, and led the Berber army to Iberia. However, the historian Ibn al-Athīr says they died with their mother.

Legacy 
Dihya was adopted as a symbol by women, and was used as a symbol against the foreign occupation, and later as a symbol against male hegemony. Indeed, already during the period of French Colonisation the Kahina was a model for the militant women who fought the French. In the Kabyle insurrection of 1851 and 1857, women such as Lalla Fatma N'Soumer and Lalla Khadija Bent Belkacem, who were known as chief warriors took the Kahina as a model.

Also, the French, in the early 20th century, anxious to Frenchify Algeria by Romanising its past, drew parallels between themselves and the Romans. The Algerian nationalists, seeking to tie Algeria to the East instead, draw the same parallels, but for them both Rome and France were colonial powers, responsible for the decline of Phoenician civilisation in the past, and Arabic civilisation in the present. Both ideologies used Kahina's mythology as a founding myth. On one side, she was the one who fought the Arabs and Islam to keep Algeria Christian, on the other, she was the one who fought all invaders (Byzantines or Arabs) to create an independent state.

In the present day, the image of the Kahina is constantly used by Berber activists to showcase how they, as a people, are strong and will not be conquered or diminished by other communities. Her face is often seen in graffiti and sculptures around Algeria to showcase their support for the progressive ideals she represents. While her true appearance is still unknown, artists have depicted her with certain aspects that reinforce the progressive movement she is known to represent. However, not all governments accept the ideals behind the Kahina. One statue of the Kahina in Baghai was condemned by the government due to blasphemy. The president of the Defense of the Arab Language said that the Kahina represented the resistance to Islam, and thus, should be condemned.

See also

 Umayyad conquest of North Africa
 Kusaila
 Colonialism

References

Bibliography
 Ibn Khaldun, Kitāb al-Ibar. Usually cited as: Histoire des Berbères et des dynasties musulmanes de l'Afrique septentrionale, a French trans. by William McGuckin de Slane, Paul Geuthner, Paris, 1978. This 19th-century translation should now be regarded as obsolete. There is a more accurate modern French translation by Abdesselam Cheddadi, Peuples et Nations du Monde: extraits des Ibar, Sindbad, Paris, 1986 & 1995. Hirschberg (1963) gives an English translation of the section where Ibn Khaldun discusses the supposed Judaized Jarāwa.
 Hannoum, Abdelmajid. (2001). Post-Colonial Memories: The Legend of the Dihyā, a North African Heroine (Studies in African Literature). . This is a study of the legend of the Dihyā in the 19th century and later. The first chapter is a detailed critique of how the legend of the Dihyā emerged after several transformations from the 9th century to the 14th.
 
 
 al-Mālikī, Riyād an-Nufūs. Partial French trans. (including the story of the Dihyā) by H.R. Idris, 'Le récit d'al-Mālikī sur la Conquête de l'Ifrīqiya', Revue des Etudes Islamiques 37 (1969) 117–149. The accuracy of this translation has been criticised by Talbi (1971) and others.
  The most recent critical study of the historical sources.
 Talbi, Mohammed. (1971). Un nouveau fragment de l'histoire de l'Occident musulman (62–196/682–812) : l'épopée d'al Kahina. (Cahiers de Tunisie vol. 19 pp. 19–52). An important historiographical study.
 at-Tijānī, Rihlat. Arabic text ed. by H.H. Abdulwahhab, Johann Wolfgang Goethe University, Frankfurt, 1994. French trans. by A. Rousseau in Journal Asiatique, section containing the story of the Dihyā is in n.s. 4, vol. 20 (1852) 57–208.

7th-century births
703 deaths
7th-century Berber people
7th-century monarchs in Africa
7th-century women rulers
African women in war
Berber Christians
Christianity in Algeria
Medieval Algeria
Muslim conquest of the Maghreb
Place of birth unknown
Place of death unknown
Queens regnant in Africa
Women in medieval warfare
Women rulers in Africa
Year of birth unknown
Year of death unknown
Zenata